Epiphthora achnias is a moth of the family Gelechiidae. It was described by Edward Meyrick in 1904. It is found in Australia, where it has been recorded from New South Wales.

The forewings are white, irrorated (sprinkled) with golden fuscous and with an oblique bar from the middle of the dorsum reaching half across the wing, and a golden-fuscous spot on the tornus. The hindwings are grey.

References

Moths described in 1904
Epiphthora
Taxa named by Edward Meyrick